"Heavy" is the first single of Lauri Ylönen from his first solo album New World. The world premiere of the song was on 26 February 2011 with a digital release on 25 February.

Track listing

Charts

References

2011 singles
2010 songs
Songs written by Lauri Ylönen